The  A19 autoroute is a motorway in France it connects the A5 with A6 between Sens in Yonne and Courtenay in Loiret. The extension to the A10 autoroute near Orléans was completed in January 2011. The A19 is part of the outermost Paris ring road.

Section from A5 (Sens) to A6 (Courtenay)

Facts
The motorway is managed by the Paris-Rhine-Rhone company. The A19 is a toll motorway and is 2x2 lanes. It 30 km is long.

History
 1993: Start of construction of 5 km section of the A160 from the A5 to RN6 (the future A19).
 1997: Start of the 25 km section to Courtenay

Junctions

  A5 to A19
 01 (Direction Sud) to 4 km: served city Sens
 Service Area: Villeroy
 02 (Paron) to 17 km: served city Subligny
  A6 to A19 at 30 km:

Section from A6 (Courtenay) to A10 (Sougy)

Facts
The motorway is operated by Arcour, a subsidiary company of the company VINCI. There are proposals to extend the road from Courtenay at exit 17 of the A6. In time the road will be extended from Courtenay to Artenay, providing a connection between the A10 to A6 motorways a total length of 101 km

History
The link from Courtenay to Sougy has been opened on 16 June 2009. This allows a connection between the A5, A6, A77, and A10.

Junctions

 03 (Courtenay-Is): served city Courtenay
 04 (Courtenay-West): served city Courtenay
 Rest Area
 05 (Montargis): served cities Montargis and Ferrières-en-Gâtinais
 Rest Area
  A77 to A19
 Service Area: Courtenay-Artenay
 06 (Beaune-La-Rolande): served city Beaune-La-Rolande
 07 (Pithiviers): served cities Pithiviers and Neuville-aux-Bois
 Rest Area
  A10 to A19
 13 (Artenay) on A10: served cities Artenay and Sougy

External links

 Site of the operator of the Arcour motorway
 A19 Motorway in Saratlas

Autoroutes in France